Tülü is a village and municipality in the Balakan District of Azerbaijan. It has a population of 5,719. The municipality consists of the villages of Tülü, Mazımqarışan, and Mazımüstü.

References 

 

Populated places in Balakan District